The Carbon Market is the largest market in Cebu City, Philippines. It is the oldest market in the Central Visayas region. As the largest market in the city, various wares are sold in Carbon, including dry goods such as clothing, kitchenware, and handicrafts, as well as wet goods, such as fruits, vegetables, and meat, among other goods, sold by approximately 6,000 vendors in the market.

In the 2020s, the market started undergoing redevelopment works aimed at modernizing the market. These works include the construction of a new main building for the market, as well as other retail amenities aside from the market. The redevelopment works are scheduled to be finished by 2025.

Etymology
The name of the Carbon Market came from the word carbón, Spanish for coal, since the area was said to be close to a coal depot used for the trains of the old Cebu Railway that ran in Cebu from the 19th century up until World War II.

History

Little is known as to when commercial activities in Carbon started. However, the district around Carbon, called Lutao ("float" in English), which also includes the Ermita barangay, is right by the coast and close to the port of Cebu, which going back to the precolonial era, already had a reputation as a “major regional trading center" in the region now known as the Visayas. It is said that trade was already present during the Spanish occupation of Cebu, and Carbon Market predates the American occupation of the Philippines.

Like much of Cebu and the Philippines, Carbon sustained heavy damages from World War II. But as the city and the country rebuilt and grew, so did the market. On May 13, 1964, then-Philippine president Diosdado Macapagal, by the virtue of the Presidential Proclamation 241, formally donated the plot of land on which Carbon stood to the local government of Cebu City, which, until then, was formally owned by the national government.

In the 1990s, there were plans to phase out the Carbon Market leading to the formation of cooperatives by vendors. In 2000, some vendors created a cooperative to sell their wares, and later two other cooperatives were formed by different units of the market. In 2002, three main cooperatives unified to form the Carbon Market Vendors Development Cooperative (Cemvedco).

In 2007, the rebuilding of the market caused a political controversy, leading one vendor to run for city council from the barangay of Ermita, winning on that single-issue platform.

As of September 2009, the Cebu City government is moving some larger commodity sellers to a newer market, the Bagsakan Center.

In the late 2010s, there was a proposal by retail firm SM Prime to redevelop the Carbon Market.

In 2020, Filipino conglomerate Megawide Construction Corporation entered into a 50-year agreement with the local government of Cebu City that will see the redevelopment of the market to include other lifestyle and mixed-use developments within the market, as well as a transport hub which includes a water taxi that will connect to Mactan–Cebu International Airport.

Facilities

Units

The market is housed in three structures namely Unit 1, Unit 2, and Unit 3, along the M.C. Briones St. in Barangay Ermita:

Unit 1 – Wet market selling meat and seafood
Unit 2 – Destroyed by a fire in 1998, reopened in 2022 as an interim market.
Unit 3 – Fruits area. Second floor razed by fire in 2018.

Others
 Freedom Park – named as Plaza Washington during the American colonial era, it was eventually renamed by then-Cebu governor Sergio Osmeña Jr. in 1951 to its current name. The name reflects it as a place where Cebuanos could freely exercise their freedoms and was the site of political rallies, religious gatherings, and debates, among other activities. The plot of land was originally owned by the Order of Augustinian Recollects (which run the University of San Jose–Recoletos across Freedom Park) to the Cebu City government, under the condition "that it be made as a park where people can exercise their constitutional right to free speech and to remain as such". In the 1960s it was gradually integrated into the market, starting out with a few stalls, until the original park eventually vanished. Since the 1960s until the 2020s redevelopment, Freedom Park was known for its flower shops. With the redevelopment, the flower shops and other stalls in Freedom Park were demolished and repurposed back to its original intended use as a public park, along with a 15-meter tall obelisk as a new symbol for the park.
Warwick Barracks – located between Freedom Park and the Carbon Market building, it was originally the called the "Post of Cebu", set up by the Americans in 1899 during their occupation of Cebu. In 1904, the name was changed into "Camp Warwick" to honor Captain Oliver Warwick who had been killed fighting Filipinos in Passi, Iloilo in 1899. A year later in 1905, it was renamed to its current name, the Warwick Barracks. After the Americans left, the Warwick Barracks were vacated and was gradually integrated into Carbon, and had also been used as a car park. After the redevelopment, Warwick Barracks will be repurposed as a retail area, and will be the location of the new Carbon Market main building until 2022
 Senior Citizens' Park Chapel – a Roman Catholic chapel which is topped by a statue of the Santo Niño de Cebú.
 Pusô Village – named and designed after the pusô, a Filipino rice cake, this strip will house food and retail stalls not available in Carbon. It is located on the edge of Carbon beside the Compañía Marítima Building along the Cebu South Coastal Road.

References

External links
 
 
 

Buildings and structures in Cebu City
Retail markets in the Philippines
Landmarks in the Philippines
Visayan landmarks
Tourist attractions in Cebu City